Norm Macdonald: Me Doing Stand-Up is a stand up DVD by comedian Norm Macdonald released by Comedy Central Records. “Norm Macdonald. Me Doing Stand-Up” DVD was released by Comedy Central on June 14, 2011. Containing special features, deleted scenes and all completely uncensored and uncut.

References

2011 comedy films
Norm Macdonald
Stand-up comedy on DVD
2010s English-language films